The Vice Guide to Travel is a travel show-style documentary show released in 2006 by Vice Media, as part of the VBS.tv online television division of Vice. The show follows Vice employees as they travel to dangerous, weird, and offbeat locations throughout the globe.

History
In 2006, VICE released the DVD The Vice Guide to Travel, which was funded by MTV and inspired by the long-running series of "Vice Guides" in the magazine. VICE reporters and camera teams visited locations such as the slums of Rio, Congo, and Paraguay. Spike Jonze helped edit the pieces.

Videos such as the Vice Guide to Travel (2006) were made accessible for free on VBS.tv, and the docu-series The Vice Guide to Liberia by Andy Capper won a Webby Award, helping foster a future partnership with CNN. The episodes are currently available at VICE.com, where VBS.tv was later merged.

Hosts and recurring characters have included Shane Smith, Trace Crutchfield, actor David Cross, Derrick Beckles, editor Gavin McInnes, artist David Choe, and Johnny Knoxville of Jackass.

Episodes
The following are the episodes of The Vice Guide to Travel.

 The Gun Markets of Pakistan
 Bulgarian Dirty Bombs
 The Radioactive Beasts of Chernobyl
 PLO Boy Scouts of Beirut
 Gorillas in the Midst
 The Slums of Rio
 Prostitutes of God
 Gypsies of Sophia
 Wodka Wars
 From Poland With Love
 Holy Thugs of Venezuela
 Jesus of Siberia
 The Warias
 Illegal Border Crossing Park
 VICE Guide to Liberia
 VICE Guide to North Korea
 North Korean Labor Camps
 VICE Guide to the Balkans
 Takanakuy: Fist fighting in the Andes
 VICE Guide to Karachi

See also
Rule Britannia (2009)
Vice (TV series) (2013)

References

External links
Show Website

2006 American television series debuts
2000s American documentary television series
Viceland original programming